The 1913 New Jersey gubernatorial election was held on November 4, 1913. Democratic acting Governor James Fairman Fielder, who resigned a week before the election so that he could succeed himself, defeated Republican former Governor Edward C. Stokes and Progressive former State Senator Everett Colby.

The state's first-ever direct primary elections for Governor were held on September 23, though the contests were largely uneventful. For the Democratic nomination, Fielder defeated former Trenton mayor Frank S. Katzenbach, making his third run for Governor. Stokes easily topped a four-man field in the Republican Party, including former U.S. Representative Charles N. Fowler, whom he had defeated in the 1910 primary for U.S. Senate. The Progressive primary was closest, with Colby defeating Montclair industrialist Edmund Burke Osborne by 29 percent of the vote.

Democratic primary

Candidates
James Fairman Fielder, State Senator for Middlesex County, President of the New Jersey Senate, and acting Governor
Frank S. Katzenbach, former mayor of Trenton and nominee for Governor in 1907

Declined
H. Otto Wittpenn, mayor of Jersey City

Results

Republican primary

Candidates
Robert Carey, former Jersey City judge
Charles N. Fowler, former U.S. Representative from Elizabeth and candidate for U.S. Senate in 1910
Carlton B. Pierce, State Senator from Union County
Edward C. Stokes, former Governor of New Jersey and candidate for U.S. Senate in 1910

Campaign
Former U.S. Representative Charles N. Fowler ran on a progressive platform favoring a convention to redraw the state constitution and various electoral reforms, including the recall of all officers except judges, initiative, referendum, and making failure to vote in a primary a bar to voting in the general election.

Results

Progressive primary

Candidates
Everett Colby, former State Senator from Essex County
Edmund Burke Osborne, Montclair art calendar industrialist

Campaign
On July 26, both candidates spoke in Ocean Grove at a mass meeting of the New Jersey Men's League for Women's Suffrage, along with George La Monte, Lillian Feickert, and Mina Van Winkle.

Osborne originally requested that Colby tour the state with him, since both candidates were from Essex County, but Colby declined before acquiescing to a debate in Montclair on September 11. The debate was moved to Newark's Kreuger Auditorium at Osborne's request to accommodate a larger audience.

Results

General election

Candidates
John C. Butterworth (Socialist Labor)
Everett Colby, former State Senator for Essex County (Progressive)
Daniel F. Dwyer (Independent)
James Fairman Fielder, State Senator for Middlesex County, President of the New Jersey Senate, and acting Governor (Democratic)
James G. Mason (Prohibition)
Edward C. Stokes, former Governor of New Jersey (Republican)
James M. Reilly (Socialist)

Results

References

1913
1913 New Jersey elections
New Jersey
November 1913 events